Julie Kitchen (born 19 April 1977) is a retired professional English female kickboxer, muay thai fighter and sports commentator.

Early life
Julie Kitchen was born at Truro Hospital to parents Ivor and Lynn Barrett, as the middle child of three daughters. Between the ages of six and eleven she attended St.Paul's School in Penzance, Cornwall. She was a shy child making very few friends and was content with family life. Her family was very close and she played the role of a second mother to her younger sister. At the age of eleven she decided to become a vegetarian because she did not like the taste of meat. She remains a vegetarian to this day, but now includes fish into her diet.

At the age of twelve she started at Humphry Davy School in Penzance where she continued to find socialising uncomfortable due to shyness. Although she did not like school, she enjoyed the subjects of Art, Mathematics and Physical Education. During this time she began to excel at the sports of hockey, netball and athletics.

In 1989 she enrolled in the Sea Cadets, and by the time she was sixteen had worked her way up the ranks to Petty Officer. She was awarded the honour of Lord Lieutenant's Cadet. Before leaving the Sea Cadets in 1993 she had considered working her way into teaching in the Navy. Julie Kitchen attributes the Sea Cadets has a major part of overcoming her shyness.

In 1993, at the age of sixteen, she went on to study a Leisure and Tourism course at Penwith College after finishing school and leaving the Sea Cadets. In this year she met her future husband, and coach Nathan Kitchen.

On 26 February 1999 she gave birth to twin daughters Allaya Kitchen and Amber Kitchen. Shortly after the birth of the twins, at the age of twenty-four, she joined Touchgloves Gym in Penzance to lose weight.

Career
Julie Kitchen won her professional debut in March 2002 against Diane Fletcher from Liverpool, England.

During her career she faced fighters from fifteen countries. She was the first British woman to win a WBC title.

Her last fight was in Los Angeles, California against British fighter Amanda Kelly on 12 January 2012. She lost via split decision after five rounds. She officially retired later that month.

Championships and awards

Titles

World Boxing Council Muaythai
2011 WBC Welterweight World Champion
International Kickboxing Federation
2010 International Kickboxing Federation (IKF) World Super Lightweight Muay Thai Champion
2010 International Kickboxing Federation (IKF) World Champion, 62.2 kg
2005 International Kickboxing Federation (IKF) Amateur Muay Thai Rules Super Lightweight British Champion, 63 kg
Backstreet Brawler & Top King
2010 World Champion, 63.5 kg (Two time)
World Muaythai Council
2009 WMC World Champion, 63 kg (Two time)
International Sport Karate Association
2009 ISKA World Champion, −66 kg
2008 ISKA World Champion, −64 kg
World Professional Muaythai Federation
2009 WPMF World Champion, 67 kg
2009 WPMF World Champion, 65 kg
Women's International Kickboxing Association
2008 WIKBA Intercontinental Champion, 63 kg
2006 WIKBA World Champion, 61.5 kg (Two time)
International MuayThai and Kickboxing Organisation
2007 IMKO European Champion, 63 kg
NMF/ITMF
2008 NMF/ITMF World Champion, 65 kg
Capital Punishment
2006 Capital Punishment World Champion, 61.5 kg
World Professional Kickboxing League
2005 WPKL British Champion, 63 kg
World Kickboxing Association
2005 WKA British Champion, 63 kg
2004 WKA British Champion, 59 kg

Other titles
2007 Golden Belt European Champion, 61.5 kg
2006 BKK Female British Junior Welterweight Champion, 63.5 kg
2005 BMBC English Champion, 60 kg
2005 FIST British Champion, 63 kg (1 defence)
2004 BKK British Champion, 63 kg

Awards
Awakening Fighters
2012 AOCA / Awakening Outstanding Contribution Award

Other awards
2011 Pride of Cornwall Award (The first ever female to win this award)
2011 Fighters Hall of Fame / Best Female Martial Artist
International Sport Kickboxing Association
2010 ISKA Fighter of the Year
2009 ISKA Fighter of the Year

After retirement
Julie Kitchen is a sports commentator for the kickboxing promotion Enfusion.

Kickboxing record

|- style="background:#fdd;"
|
| style="text-align:center;"|Loss
| Amanda Kelly
|In Honor of the King, Playa Vista
| Los Angeles, California
| style="text-align:center;"|Decision (Split)
|align=center|
|align=center|
| style="text-align:center;"|
|-
! style=background:white colspan=9 |
|-
|- style="background:#fdd;"
|
| style="text-align:center;"|Loss
| Miriam Nakamoto
| 
| Pala Casino, San Diego, California, United States
| style="text-align:center;"|Decision (Unanimous)
|align=center|3
|align=center|
| style="text-align:center;"|
|-
! style=background:white colspan=9 |
|- style="background:#cfc;"
|
| style="text-align:center;" |Win
| Aleide Lawant	
| 
| 
| style="text-align:center;" |Decision (Unanimous)
| align="center" |5
| align="center" |3:00
| style="text-align:center;" |
|-
! style=background:white colspan=9 |
|- style="background:#c5d2e;"
|
| style="text-align:center;" |NC
| Maria Bastasin	
|Enfusion: Quest for Honour
| Prague, Czech Republic
| style="text-align:center;" |No contest (cut by clash of heads)
| align="center" |1
| align="center" |0:15
| style="text-align:center;" |
|-
|- style="background:#cfc;"
|
| style="text-align:center;" |Win
| Sandra Bastian	
|MuayThai Premier League: Blood & Steel
| Netherlands
| style="text-align:center;" |Points
| align="center" |3
| align="center" |3:00
| style="text-align:center;" |
|-
|- style="background:#cfc;"
|
| style="text-align:center;" |Win
| Martina Jindrová	
|MuayThai Premier League: Stars and Stripes
| Los Angeles, California, United States
| style="text-align:center;" |Decision (Unanimous)
| align="center" |3
| align="center" |3:00
| style="text-align:center;" |
|-
|- style="background:#cfc;"
|
| style="text-align:center;" |Win
| Nan Pimnipa	
| 
| Pattaya, Thailand
| style="text-align:center;" |TKO (knee to the body and elbow)
| align="center" |3
| align="center" |N/A
| style="text-align:center;" |
|-
! style=background:white colspan=9 |
|- style="background:#cfc;"
|
| style="text-align:center;" |Win
| Annalisa Bucci	
|MT England vs Italy
| Blackpool, England, United Kingdom
| style="text-align:center;" |Decision
| align="center" |5
| align="center" |3:00
| style="text-align:center;" |
|-
! style=background:white colspan=9 |
|- style="background:#cfc;"
|
| style="text-align:center;"|Win
| Claire Haigh
| 
| Cornwall, England, United Kingdom
| style="text-align:center;"|Decision (Split)
|align=center|3
|align=center|3:00
| style="text-align:center;"|
|-
! style=background:white colspan=9 |
|- style="background:#cfc;"
|
| style="text-align:center;"|Win
| Claire Haigh
|Kings Cup Tournament
| Bangkok, Thailand
| style="text-align:center;"|Points
|align=center|5
|align=center|3:00
| style="text-align:center;"|
|-
|- style="background:#cfc;"
|
| style="text-align:center;"|Win
| Karen Lynch
|Muay Thai Addicts II
| London, England, United Kingdom
| style="text-align:center;"|Decision (Unanimous)
|align=center|5
|align=center|3:00
| style="text-align:center;"|
|-
|- style="background:#cfc;"
|
| style="text-align:center;"|Win
| Natalie Fuz
| 
| Cornwall, England, United Kingdom
| style="text-align:center;"|Decision (Unanimous)
|align=center|5
|align=center|3:00
| style="text-align:center;"|
|-
! style=background:white colspan=9 |
|- style="background:#cfc;"
|
| style="text-align:center;"|Win
| Angela Rivera-Parr
| 
| Kingston, Jamaica
| style="text-align:center;"|Decision (Unanimous)
|align=center|
|align=center|
| style="text-align:center;"|
|-
! style=background:white colspan=9 |
|- style="background:#cfc;"
|
| style="text-align:center;"|Win
| Chantal Ughi
| 
| Bangkok, Thailand
| style="text-align:center;"|Points
|align=center|5
|align=center|2:00
| style="text-align:center;"|
|-
! style=background:white colspan=9 |
|- style="background:#cfc;"
|
| style="text-align:center;"|Win
| Paula Wilkie
|Sportfight Scotland & Ireland Show
| Oranmore, Ireland
| style="text-align:center;"|TKO
|align=center|5
|align=center|N/A
| style="text-align:center;"|
|-
! style=background:white colspan=9 |
|- style="background:#cfc;"
|
| style="text-align:center;" |Win
| Ivanilda vaz Te	
| 
| Cornwall, England, United Kingdom
| style="text-align:center;" |Decision (Unanimous)
| align="center" |5
| align="center" |3:00
| style="text-align:center;" |
|-
! style=background:white colspan=9 |
|- style="background:#cfc;"
|
| style="text-align:center;" |Win
| Hatice Özyurt	
| 
| Steenwijk, United Kingdom
| style="text-align:center;" |Decision (Unanimous)
| align="center" |5
| align="center" |2:00
| style="text-align:center;" |
|-
! style=background:white colspan=9 |
|-
|- style="background:#fdd;"
|
| style="text-align:center;"|Loss
| Germaine de Randamie
| 
| Montego Bay, Jamaica
| style="text-align:center;"|Decision
|align=center|3
|align=center|3:00
| style="text-align:center;"|
|-
! style=background:white colspan=9 |
|- style="background:#cfc;"
|
| style="text-align:center;"|Win
| Kerry Vera
|Battle in Bournemouth V
| Bournemouth, England, United Kingdom
| style="text-align:center;"|Decision (Unanimous)
|align=center|5
|align=center|3:00
| style="text-align:center;"|
|-
|- style="background:#fdd;"
|
| style="text-align:center;"|Loss
| Natalie Fuz
|Mayhem X: Mayhem moves to Midtown
| New York City, United States
| style="text-align:center;"|Decision (Majority)
|align=center|5
|align=center|2:00
| style="text-align:center;"|
|-
|- style="background:#cfc;"
|
| style="text-align:center;"|Win
| Karen Lynch
| 
| United Kingdom
| style="text-align:center;"|Decision 
|align=center|5
|align=center|3:00
| style="text-align:center;"|
|-
! style=background:white colspan=9 |
|- style="background:#cfc;"
|
| style="text-align:center;"|Win
| Itziar Onaindi Abad
|Lady Killers Fight Night
| United Kingdom
| style="text-align:center;"|Decision 
|align=center|5
|align=center|2:00
| style="text-align:center;"|
|-
|- style="background:#cfc;"
|
| style="text-align:center;"|Win
| Sonia Mirabelli
|World Muay Thai Championships
| Liverpool, England, United Kingdom
| style="text-align:center;"|N/A 
|align=center|N/A
|align=center|N/A
| style="text-align:center;"|
|-
|- style="background:#cfc;"
|
| style="text-align:center;"|Win
| Emma Bowers
| 
| Torquay, England, United Kingdom
| style="text-align:center;"|Decision (Majority)
|align=center|3
|align=center|3:00
| style="text-align:center;"|
|-
|- style="background:#cfc;"
|
| style="text-align:center;"|Win
| Natalie Fuz
|Mayhem at Mulberry
| New York City, United States
| style="text-align:center;"|Decision (Majority)
|align=center|3
|align=center|3:00
| style="text-align:center;"|
|-
|- style="background:#cfc;"
|
| style="text-align:center;"|Win
| Sonia Mirabelli
|Capital Punishment
| London, England, United Kingdom
| style="text-align:center;"|Decision (Majority)
|align=center|5
|align=center|3:00
| style="text-align:center;"|
|-
|- style="background:#cfc;"
|
| style="text-align:center;"|Win
| Loli Muñoz Garcia
|K-1 event in London
| Torquay, England, United Kingdom
| style="text-align:center;"|Points
|align=center|5
|align=center|3:00
| style="text-align:center;"|
|-	
! style=background:white colspan=9 |
|- style="background:#cfc;"
|
| style="text-align:center;"|Win
| Natalie Bee
|Battle in Bournemouth III
| Bournemouth, England, United Kingdom
| style="text-align:center;"|Points
|align=center|5
|align=center|3:00
| style="text-align:center;"|
|-	
! style=background:white colspan=9 |
|- style="background:#cfc;"
|
| style="text-align:center;"|Win
| Lucy Hunking
|BKK Promotions: All Female Show
| Plymouth, England, United Kingdom
| style="text-align:center;"|Points
|align=center|5
|align=center|2:00
| style="text-align:center;"|
|-
! style=background:white colspan=9 |
|- style="background:#fdd;"
|
| style="text-align:center;"|Loss
| Nicky Carter
|Muay Thai Warriors 6
| Crawley, England, United Kingdom
| style="text-align:center;"|Points
|align=center|5
|align=center|2:00
| style="text-align:center;"|
|-
! style=background:white colspan=9 |
|- style="background:#cfc;"
|
| style="text-align:center;"|Win
| Karla Hood
| 
| London, England, United Kingdom
| style="text-align:center;"|TKO (Knees to the body)
|align=center|N/A
|align=center|N/A
| style="text-align:center;"|
|-
|- style="background:#cfc;"
|
| style="text-align:center;"|Win
| Lucy Hunking
|Muay Thai Warriors 5
| Crawley, England, United Kingdom
| style="text-align:center;"|Decision (Unanimous)
|align=center|5
|align=center|2:00
| style="text-align:center;"|
|-
! style=background:white colspan=9 |
|- style="background:#cfc;"
|
| style="text-align:center;"|Win
| Sheree Halliday
|Woking Muay Thai Show
| Woking, England, United Kingdom
| style="text-align:center;"|Points
|align=center|5
|align=center|2:00
| style="text-align:center;"|
|-
! style=background:white colspan=9 |	
|- style="background:#fdd;"
|
| style="text-align:center;"|Loss
| Bernise Alldis
|Muay Thai Warriors 3
| Crawley, England, United Kingdom
| style="text-align:center;"|Points
|align=center|5
|align=center|2:00
| style="text-align:center;"|
|-
|- style="background:#cfc;"
|
| style="text-align:center;"|Win
| Rebecca Donnelly
| 
| Crawley, England, United Kingdom
| style="text-align:center;"|Decision (Unanimous)
|align=center|5
|align=center|2:00
| style="text-align:center;"|
|-
! style=background:white colspan=9 |
|- style="background:#fdd;"
|
| style="text-align:center;"|Loss
| Emma Bowers
| 
| Torquay, England, United Kingdom
| style="text-align:center;"|Points
|align=center|3
|align=center|3:00
| style="text-align:center;"|
|-	
|- style="background:#fdd;"
|
| style="text-align:center;"|Loss
| Karla Hood
| 
| 
| style="text-align:center;"|Points
|align=center|3
|align=center|3:00
| style="text-align:center;"|
|-
|- style="background:#cfc;"
|
| style="text-align:center;"|Win
| Jo Abrehart
| 
| 
| style="text-align:center;"|Points
|align=center|3
|align=center|3:00
| style="text-align:center;"|
|-
|- style="background:#cfc;"
|
| style="text-align:center;"|Win
| Diane Fletcher
| 
| 
| style="text-align:center;"|Points
|align=center|3
|align=center|3:00
| style="text-align:center;"|
|-				

|- style="background:#fdd;"
| 2009-05-21 || Loss ||align=left| Katarina Perkkiö || IFMA European Championships || Liepāja, Latvia || Decision (Unanimous) || 4 || 2:00 
|- style="background:#cfc;"
| 2005-09-10 || Win ||align=left| Shelley Wilson ||  || Kent, England || Points || N/A || N/A 
|-
| colspan=9 | Legend:

See also
 List of female kickboxers

References

External links
 Official Julie Kitchen Website
 Julie Kitchen at Awakening Fighters
 Julie Kitchen Facebook Athlete Page

1977 births
Living people
English female kickboxers
English Muay Thai practitioners
Female Muay Thai practitioners
People educated at Humphry Davy School
Sportspeople from Penzance